Verdi is an unincorporated community in Washington County, Iowa, United States, at the junction of Iowa Highway 1 and 290th Street.

History
Verdi's population was 14 in 1902, 21 in 1917, and 27 in 1925. Its post office closed in 1915.

Notes

Unincorporated communities in Washington County, Iowa
Unincorporated communities in Iowa